The Southern Railway Spencer Shops are a former locomotive repair facility in Spencer, North Carolina. The shops were one of the Southern Railway's primary maintenance facilities. The shops were built in the 1890s and named after Southern Railway president Samuel Spencer. Following dieselization, the need for the Spencer Shops diminished, and the facilities were decommissioned in the 1970s. The Spencer Shops and associated land were donated by the Southern Railway to the state of North Carolina, which established the North Carolina Transportation Museum on the site.

References

External links

Spencer Shops
Historic American Engineering Record in North Carolina
Tourist attractions in North Carolina
Buildings and structures in Rowan County, North Carolina
Railway workshops in the United States
Industrial buildings and structures on the National Register of Historic Places in North Carolina
National Register of Historic Places in Rowan County, North Carolina
Railway workshops on the National Register of Historic Places
Railway buildings and structures on the National Register of Historic Places in North Carolina